Abashiri is a Japanese city.

Abashiri may also refer to:
Abashiri District, Hokkaido
Abashiri Station